Ronald Winston Yuan is an American actor, martial artist, director, and stunt choreographer. He is best known for his roles on Sons of Anarchy, Prison Break, Golden Boy, and CSI: NY. He has acted in numerous films, including an ensemble lead as Sgt. Qiang in Disney's live-action adaptation Mulan. He also supplied the voice of Sgt. Fideltin Rusk in the video game series Star Wars: The Old Republic, and Scorpion in Mortal Kombat 11 (replacing Patrick Seitz) .

Early life
Yuan was born in New York City, New York, the son of Theresa and Joseph Yuan, and the brother of actor Roger Yuan.

Career

Acting

Film
Yuan appeared in Roland Emmerich's Independence Day sequel, Independence Day: Resurgence, playing Yeong, the main weapons engineer. Before that, Yuan appeared in the film The Accountant (directed by Gavin O'Connor), with Ben Affleck, J. K. Simmons and Anna Kendrick, playing a reluctant Silat master. Yuan had a cameo in Martin Scorsese's Revenge of the Green Dragons, directed by Andrew Lau (Infernal Affairs) and Andrew Loo, playing the feared leader of the notorious BTK.  Yuan also joined Francesca Eastwood and Annie Q. in Cardinal X, produced by Richard Bosner (Fruitvale Station) and Cassian Elwes in a semi-autobiographical film from first time director Angie Wang based on a college freshman in the 1980s who becomes an expert manufacturer and dealer of ecstasy.

Yuan also had memorable turns on hit films Art of War, Fast and Furious, Cradle 2 the Grave, Blood and Bone, and Red Dawn.

TV
Yuan was a series regular on the Netflix show, the Weinstein Company's "Marco Polo" created by John Fusco. Yuan plays Prince Nayan, a fiery eyed descendant of Genghis Khan. Nayan is a converted Christian that rules all of Manchuria and whose closely watched actions will affect Kublai's control of Asia.

Yuan has also appeared on Jon Bokenkamp's hit show "The Blacklist" as mysterious Blacklister Quon Zhang. Yuan was also seen in the final season of "Sons of Anarchy" as the intense and unpredictable Ryu Tom.  Yuan played hard-nosed Lt. Peter Kang in the short lived CBS series "Golden Boy" from Nicholas Wootton and Greg Berlanti. Yuan also had recent cameo special guest appearances on the TV shows "Castle" and "Justified". Yuan also played the iconic Japanese character Scorpion for Warner Bros' secret Mortal Kombat X "Generations".

In the past, Yuan was cast in a leading role on HBO pilot "All Signs of Death" opposite Ben Whishaw, directed by Alan Ball (True Blood). Yuan recently had character arcs on FOX's "Touch" opposite Keifer Sutherland created by Tim Kring (Heroes), NBC's "Awake" opposite Jason Isaacs and FOX pilot "Exit Strategy" with Ethan Hawke directed by Antoine Fuqua (Training Day).

Yuan also had memorable turns on other hit series "Prison Break", "CSI:NY", "24", "Burn Notice", "NCIS:LA", "Pushing Daisies", and "Entourage".

Video game voicework
Yuan has also been the voice behind major video or computer games such as Call of Duty-Black Ops 2, Halo, Star War's Old Republic, Resident Evil, World of Warcraft, Medal of Honor, Army of Two, Guild Wars 2, Deus Ex, Drake's Uncharted,Red Alert 3 and many more.

Action directing and choreography
Yuan designed the fight sequences as well as going behind camera as Action Director for Steve Chasman/ Jason Statham's "Wild Card" scripted by William Goldman and directed by Simon West. Yuan just finished designing and directing the action on the popular Taiwanese/ Chinese/ International action franchise "PiZi Ying Xiong 2"(Black&White 2) shot entirely in Taiwan.

Directing and writing
He has directed and written several short films so far, including Lollipops (2009), Three Bullets (2009) (starring Michael Jai White) and Tea and Remembrance (2009), starring himself and Marie Matiko. He is currently working on a feature project entitled "Unspoken" starring Russell Wong, Brian Tee, Will Yun Lee, and Ian Anthony Dale.

Yuan later directed Step Up: Year of the Dance, a Chinese dance film of the Step Up franchise.

Filmography

Film

Television

Video games

References

External links
Ron Yuan's official website 

Living people
American film directors of Chinese descent
American male actors of Chinese descent
American male film actors
American male television actors
American male video game actors
American male voice actors
Male actors from New York City
Year of birth missing (living people)
20th-century American male actors
21st-century American male actors